Love is the third studio album by Scottish pop group Aztec Camera, released in November 1987 on Sire. While it was released under the Aztec Camera name, Roddy Frame was the only remaining permanent member of the group and he recorded the album alongside a group of session musicians. Departing from the indie and folk-rock approach of earlier records, Love incorporated R&B influences, seemingly to break the American market. It failed to do so but did achieve commercial success in the UK, reaching No. 10 on the albums chart, following the success of its third single "Somewhere in My Heart", which reached No. 3 on the UK Singles Chart. As a result, it became the band's most commercially successful album.

Track listing

Personnel
Roddy Frame - vocals, guitar (all tracks)
Rob Mounsey - bass (1), keyboards (3,6,9) keyboard programming (1,6,7,9) drum programming (7)
Carroll Thompson - lead vocals (7)
Marcus Miller (2,8), Kent Wagner (5), Will Lee (6,9) - bass
Peter Beckett - keyboards (3)
David Frank - keyboards, programming (2,8)
Robbie Kilgore - bass synthesizer (3)
Dave Weckl (1-3), Steve Jordan (6,9), Steve Gadd (8) - drums
Carol Steele - percussion (1,6,7)
Dan Hartman (1,3), Jill Dell'Abate (1,3), Lani Groves (1,2,6-8), Tawatha Agee (1,3), Gordon Grody (2,6-8), Robin Clark (2,6-8), Scott Parker (4), Loria Jonzun (5) - backing vocals
Jimmy Bralower - drums (4), drum programming (1,3)
Jeff Bova - bass, keyboard programming (4)
Michael Jonzun - drums, keyboard programming, backing vocals (5)
Soni Jonzun - saxophone (4)
Technical
Peter Saville Associates - design and art direction

Singles
"How Men Are" (UK No. 25)
"Somewhere in My Heart" (UK No. 3)
"Working in a Goldmine" (UK No. 31) 
"Deep & Wide & Tall" (UK No. 55)

References

Aztec Camera albums
1987 albums
Albums produced by Tommy LiPuma
Albums produced by Russ Titelman
Albums produced by Rob Mounsey
Albums produced by Michael Jonzun
Sire Records albums
Contemporary R&B albums by Scottish artists
Dance-pop albums by Scottish artists
Synth-pop albums by Scottish artists
Soul albums by Scottish artists